Morocco is a sovereign country located in the Maghreb region of North Africa. Morocco's economy is considered a relatively liberal economy governed by the law of supply and demand. Since 1993, the country has followed a policy of privatisation of certain economic sectors which used to be in the hands of the government. Morocco has become a major player in the African economic affairs, and is the 5th African economy by GDP (PPP). Morocco was ranked the 1st African country by the Economist Intelligence Unit' quality-of-life index, ahead of South Africa. However, Morocco has since then slipped into fourth place behind Egypt, but ahead of Angola.

Notable firms 
This list includes notable companies with primary headquarters located in the country. The industry and sector follow the Industry Classification Benchmark taxonomy. Organizations which have ceased operations are included and noted as defunct.

See also 
 List of airlines of Morocco
 List of banks in Morocco
 MADEX index
 MASI index

References 

 
Morocco